Canoeing at the 2020 Summer Olympics in Tokyo was contested in two main disciplines: canoe slalom, to take place from 25 to 30 July 2021, and canoe sprint, from 2 to 7 August. The slalom competitions will be held at the Kasai Canoe Slalom Course; whereas the sprint events will be staged at Sea Forest Waterway.

The competition featured 16 events. The programme saw four event changes, all replacements, from 2016. In sprint, the men's C-1 200 metres and men's K-2 200 metres were replaced with women's C-1 200 metres and women's C-2 500 metres. In slalom, the men's C-2 was removed. Women's C-1 was added. These three changes were part of the Olympics' move towards gender equality. In addition, the sprint men's K-4 1000 metres was replaced with a shorter race, the men's K-4 500 metres.

Qualification

Competition schedule

Participating nations
Below is the list of NOCs participants in the canoeing competition at the 2020 Summer Olympics.

 Hosts

Competitors

Medal summary

Medal table

Slalom

Sprint
Men

Women

See also
Canoeing at the 2018 Asian Games
Canoeing at the 2018 Summer Youth Olympics
Canoeing at the 2019 African Games
Canoe sprint at the 2019 European Games
Canoeing at the 2019 Pan American Games
Paracanoeing at the 2020 Summer Paralympics

References

External links
International Canoe Federation
 Results book – Canoe Slalom 
 Results book – Canoe Sprint 

 
Canoeing and kayaking competitions in Japan
Canoeing at the Summer Olympics
2020 Summer Olympics events
2021 in canoeing